Cortez is a home rule municipality that is the county seat and the most populous municipality of Montezuma County, Colorado, United States. The city population was 8,766 at the 2020 United States Census.

History
In 1886, the town was built to provide housing for the men working on the tunnels and irrigation ditches required to divert water out of the Dolores River and into Montezuma Valley. The town was named for Spanish conquistador Hernán Cortés.

It is a popular stop for tourists, who stay there because of its central location among surrounding attractions, such as Mesa Verde National Park, Monument Valley, and the Four Corners.

Prehistoric sites
There are many prehistoric sites in the Cortez area, listed on the Colorado State Register of Historic Properties or both the state register and the National Register of Historic Places: They include large parks or centers, such as Crow Canyon Archaeological Center, Canyon of the Ancients National Monument, Hovenweep National Monument, and Mesa Verde National Park. There are also smaller or individuals sites, such as Cowboy Wash, Hawkins Pueblo and cliff dwellings, Lowry Ruin, Mitchell Springs Archeological Site, also known as the Mitchell Springs Ruin Group, Mud Springs Pueblo, and Yucca House National Monument. Within the McElmo Drainage Unit (AD 1075-1300) is Cannonball Ruins,  Maxwell Community, Roy's Ruin, Sand Canyon Archaeological District, and Wallace Ruin.

Historic trails or byways
The following are trails or byways through the Cortez area:
Old Spanish National Historic Trail
San Juan Skyway National Scenic Byway
Trail of the Ancients

1959 U-2 emergency landing
A Lockheed U-2 reconnaissance aircraft made an emergency nighttime forced landing August 3, 1959, at the Cortez Municipal Airport. Republic of China Air Force Major Hsi-Chun Mike Hua was on a training flight originating at Laughlin AFB, Texas; the U-2 aircraft engine flamed out at 70,000 feet MSL. Maj. Hua established best glide and was able to navigate through a valley to a lighted airport that wasn't on his map, of the existence of which he was unaware until he found it. The airport was the only one in the area with a lighted runway which was illuminated overnight.

Geography
Cortez is located at  (37.349270, -108.579225).

At the 2020 United States Census, the city had a total area of  including  of water.

Cortez is located in the area of the southwest known as the "High Desert", as are most of northwestern, western, southwestern, and southern Colorado.

Climate
Cortez has a dry-summer continental climate (Köppen Dsb), though it borders on a semi-arid climate (BSk) due to low precipitation. The city has hot summer days and cold winter nights, the latter a result of its elevation.

Demographics

As of the census of 2010, there were 8,482 people, 3,590 households, and 2,234 families residing in the city. The gender makeup of the city was 48.1% male (4,083) and 51.9% female (4,399). The racial makeup of the city was 79.2% White, 0.4% African American, 11.8% Native American, 0.8% Asian, 0.00% Pacific Islander, 6.04% from other races, and 2.44% from two or more races. Hispanic or Latino of any race were 13.30% of the population.

There were 3,590 households, out of which 30.8% had children under the age of 18 living with them, 42.0% were married couples living together, 14.8% had a female householder with no husband present, and 37.8% were non-families. 30.0% of all households were made up of individuals, and 12.7% had someone living alone who was 65 years of age or older.  The average household size was 2.33 and the average family size was 2.92.

In the city, the population was spread out, with 26.7% under the age of 18, 8.8% from 18 to 24, 26.6% from 25 to 44, 21.6% from 45 to 64, and 16.4% who were 65 years of age or older.  The median age was 36 years. For every 100 females, there were 91.4 males.  For every 100 females age 18 and over, there were 84.4 males.

The median income for a household in the city was $28,776, and the median income for a family was $35,533. Males had a median income of $30,755 versus $20,280 for females. The per capita income for the city was $18,040.  About 14.8% of families and 18.6% of the population were below the poverty line, including 27.3% of those under age 18 and 17.3% of those age 65 or over.

Economy

Cortez is a local commercial center, competing with Durango in the east, and Farmington, New Mexico in the south, and draws trade from southeastern Utah, the extreme northeastern corner of Arizona, the Shiprock area of Northwestern New Mexico, and San Miguel, Dolores, Montezuma, and parts of La Plata County in Colorado. Its economy is based very heavily on tourism, both to nearby Mesa Verde National Park as well as to San Juan National Forest, Bureau of Land Management (BLM) lands in the area (including Canyons of the Ancients National Monument, as well as the Ute Mountain Ute Tribe and Navajo Indian Reservations).

Mesa Verde National Park, featuring Ancestral Pueblo cliff dwellings, is situated southeast of Cortez.

Cortez is home to the headquarters of Osprey Packs, who employ over 100 people in Cortez.

Education
Cortez Public Schools are part of the Montezuma-Cortez School District RE-1. The district has one preschool, five elementary schools, one middle school and one high school. The educational system is currently suffering a loss of 1.6% according to the Transitional Colorado Assessment Program.

Montezuma-Cortez RE-1 Pre-School, Kemper Elementary School, Lewis-Arriola Elementary School, Manaugh Elementary School, Mesa Elementary Schools,  Pleasant View Elementary School, Cortez Middle School and Montezuma-Cortez High School are located in Cortez. The high school mascot is the Panther.

Government
The City Council of Cortez is composed of seven members including the Mayor and Mayor Pro-tem. The current mayor of Cortez is Rachel Medina.

Transportation
Cortez Municipal Airport serves Cortez. Cortez is part of Colorado's Bustang network. It is on the Durango-Grand Junction Outrider line.

Notable people 
Eli Tomac, Motocross & 2020 Supercross champion.
Scott Tipton, U.S. House of Representatives - Colorado's 3rd District 
William B. Ebbert, popular rancher and politician, represented Cortez in the Colorado General Assembly in early 20th century.
Michael Milenski, Cortez native who was founder and general director of Long Beach Opera.
Vince Lee, American architect, climber, mountaineer, Andean explorer, environmentalist, megalith researcher
Chuck Nevitt, former NBA basketball player

See also

Colorado
Bibliography of Colorado
Index of Colorado-related articles
Outline of Colorado
List of counties in Colorado
List of municipalities in Colorado
List of places in Colorado
Four Corners

References

External links

City of Cortez website
CDOT map of the City of Cortez

Cities in Montezuma County, Colorado
Cities in Colorado
County seats in Colorado
Populated places established in 1886
1886 establishments in Colorado